Beyler Dam is a dam in Kastamonu Province, Turkey. It was built between 1987 and 1994.

See also
List of dams and reservoirs in Turkey

External links
DSI

Dams in Kastamonu Province
Dams completed in 1994